Nigerian Pidgin, also called Naijá or Naija, is an English-based creole language spoken as a lingua franca across Nigeria. The language is sometimes referred to as "Pijin" or Broken (pronounced "Brokun"). It can be spoken as a pidgin, a creole, dialect or a decreolised acrolect by different speakers, who may switch between these forms depending on the social setting. In the 2010s, a common orthography was developed for Pidgin which has been gaining significant popularity in giving the language a harmonized writing system.

Variations of what this article refers to as "Nigerian Pidgin" are also spoken across West and Central Africa, in countries such as Benin, Ghana, and Cameroon.

As an example, the English phrase, "how are you?" would be "how you dey?" in Pidgin.

Status 
Nigerian Pidgin is commonly used throughout the country, but it has not been granted official status. Pidgin breaks the communication barrier between different ethnic groups and it is widely spoken throughout Nigeria.

In 2011, Google launched a search interface in Pidgin English. In 2017, BBC started BBC News Pidgin to provide services in Pidgin.

Variations 
Many of the 250 or more ethnic groups in Nigeria can converse in the language, though many speakers will utilize words from their native tongues. For example, the Yorùbá people use the word ṣebi when speaking Pidgin. It is often used at the start or end of an intonated sentence or question: "You are coming, right?" becomes "Ṣebi you dey come?"

Another example is the Igbo and the use of the word abi (another variant of the words ṣebi and ba), adding the word nna, also used at the beginning of some sentences, to show camaraderie: For example, "Man, that test was very hard." becomes "Nna mehn, that test hard no be small." Another Igbo word that has gotten precedence in pidgin is una, derived from the Igbo word unu which is equivalent to the English term "you people". For example, "Una dey mad" in Nigerian Pidgin translates to, "You people are crazy." in English. Unu has also found its way to Jamaican patois, with the same meaning as in Nigerian Pidgin. Another Igbo word that is often used in Nigerian Pidgin is biko, which comes from the Igbo word for "please." For example, the sentence, "Biko free me." translates to "Please leave me alone." in English. The Hausa often add ba at the end of an intonated sentence or question. For example, "you no wan come ba?" which translates to "You don't want to come, right?"

Nigerian Pidgin also varies from place to place. Dialects of Nigerian Pidgin may include the Sapele-Warri-Ughelli dialect that has majorly influenced large parts of Nigeria, Benin City dialect that has its influence from Bini language, Port Harcourt dialect that has elements of the mixed tribes in Rivers State,  Lagos (particularly in Ajegunle influenced by sizeable Niger Deltan populace); and Onitsha varieties that draws influence from Igbo language.

Nigerian Pidgin is most widely spoken in the oil state Niger Delta where most of its population speak it as their first language. There are accounts of pidgin being spoken first in colonial Nigeria before being adopted by other countries along the West African coast.

While pidgin is spoken by many, there are wide swathes of Nigeria where pidgin is not spoken or understood, especially among those without secular education in core northern parts — Gombe State, Yobe State — of Nigeria.

Relationship to other languages and dialects

Similarity to Caribbean Creoles 
Nigerian Pidgin, along with the various pidgin and creole languages of West Africa, share similarities to the various English-based Creoles found in the Caribbean.
Linguists posit that this is because most of the enslaved that were taken to the New World were of West African descent.
The pronunciation and accents often differ a great deal, mainly due to the extremely heterogeneous mix of African languages present in the West Indies, but if written on paper or spoken slowly, the creole languages of the Caribbean are for the most part mutually intelligible with the creole languages of West Africa.
The presence of repetitive phrases in Caribbean Creole such as su-su (gossip) and pyaa-pyaa (sickly) mirror the presence of such phrases in West African languages such as bam-bam, which means "complete" in the Yoruba language.
Repetitious phrases are also present in Nigerian Pidgin, such as koro-koro meaning "clear vision", yama-yama meaning "disgusting", and doti-doti meaning "garbage".

Furthermore, the use of words of West African origin in Jamaican Patois, such as unu and Bajan dialect wunna or una – West African Pidgin (meaning "you people", a word that comes from the Igbo word unu or unuwa also meaning "you people"), display some of the interesting similarities between the English pidgins and creoles of West Africa and the English pidgins and creoles of the West Indies, as does the presence of words and phrases that are identical in the languages on both sides of the Atlantic, such as Me a go tell dem (I'm going to tell them) and make we (let us).

A copula deh or dey is found in both Caribbean Creole and Nigerian Pidgin English.
The phrase We dey foh London would be understood by both a speaker of Creole and a speaker of Nigerian Pidgin to mean "We are in London" (although the Jamaican is more likely to say Wi de a London).
The word originates from the Igbo word di meaning the same thing and pronounced similarly: anu di na ofe (literally "meat is in pot") and anyi di na london (lit. "we are in London").
Other similarities, such as pikin (Nigerian Pidgin for "child") and pikney (used in islands like St.Vincent, Antigua and St. Kitts, akin to the standard-English pejorative/epithet pickaninny) and chook (Nigerian Pidgin for "poke" or "stab") which corresponds with the Bajan Creole word juk, and also corresponds to chook used in other West Indian islands.

Connection to Portuguese language 
Being derived partly from the present day Edo/Delta area of Nigeria, there are still some words left over from the Portuguese language in pidgin English (Portuguese ships traded enslaved peoples from the Bight of Benin). For example, "you sabi do am?" means "do you know how to do it?". "Sabi" means "to know" or "to know how to", just as "to know" is "saber" in Portuguese. (According to the monogenetic theory of pidgins, sabir was a basic word in Mediterranean Lingua Franca, brought to West Africa through Portuguese pidgin. An English cognate is savvy.) Also, "pikin" or "pickaninny" comes from the Portuguese words "pequeno" and "pequenino", which mean "small" and "small child" respectively.

Nigerian English 
Similar to the Caribbean Creole situation, Nigerian Pidgin is mostly used in informal conversations. Nigerian Pidgin has no status as an official language. Nigerian English is used in politics, education, science, and media. In Nigeria, English is acquired through formal education. As English has been in contact with multiple different languages in Nigeria, Nigerian English has become much more prominent, and it is often referred to as a group of different sub-varieties. Although there is not a formal description of Nigerian English, scholars agree that Nigerian English is a recognizable and unique variety of English.

Homophones 
Like many pidgins, Nigerian Pidgin collapses English phonology to a smaller number of phonemes.
This produces many homophones; for example, thin, thing, and tin are all pronounced like [tʰin].
This gives high importance to context, tone, body language, and other ways of communication for the distinction of the homophones.

See also 

 Krio
 Pichinglis
 Languages of Nigeria

References

Notes

Bibliography 
 
 
  
 
 Ernest Edjeren. 2009. "Single Language: The Soul Of Nations' Prosperity"

External links 

 
 University of Puerto Rico, Nigerian Pidgin materials
 A Dictionary of Nigerian English (circulation draft); Blench, Roger. 2005 (Internet Archive)
 Introduction to Nigerian Pidgin (University of Hawaii)

English-based pidgins and creoles of Africa
Krio language
Nigerian English
Languages of Nigeria